Harlene Orendain-Raguin (born June 14, 1983) is a Filipina épée fencer. She is the 2007 and 2015 Southeast Asian Games individual épée silver medalist, a 2019 team épée gold medalist, a 2015 team épée silver medalist, and a member of the bronze-winning teams at the 2005, 2007, and 2011 Southeast Asian Games.

Locally, Raguin became the women's épée champion at the 2014 Philippine National Games. During her college years, she represented the University of Santo Tomas Growling Tigers for five years from 2001 to 2005. She was named rookie of the year during the UAAP Season 65 after winning silver medals in both the individual and team épée events.

References

1983 births
Living people
Filipino female épée fencers
University Athletic Association of the Philippines players
Sportspeople from Pangasinan
University of Santo Tomas alumni
Southeast Asian Games medalists in fencing
Southeast Asian Games silver medalists for the Philippines
Southeast Asian Games bronze medalists for the Philippines
Competitors at the 2005 Southeast Asian Games
Competitors at the 2007 Southeast Asian Games
Competitors at the 2011 Southeast Asian Games
Competitors at the 2015 Southeast Asian Games
Competitors at the 2017 Southeast Asian Games
Southeast Asian Games gold medalists for the Philippines
Competitors at the 2019 Southeast Asian Games